Naquetia triqueter, common name : the three-angled murex, is a species of sea snail, a marine gastropod mollusk in the family Muricidae, the murex snails or rock snails.

Description
The shell size varies between 50 mm and 75 mm

Distribution
This species is distributed in the Indian Ocean along Madagascar, Tanzania, Chagos and the Mascarene Basin; and in the Western Pacific Ocean.

References

 Dautzenberg, Ph. (1929). Mollusques testaces marins de Madagascar. Faune des Colonies Francaises, Tome III
 Spry, J.F. (1961). The sea shells of Dar es Salaam: Gastropods. Tanganyika Notes and Records 56
 Abbott, R.T. & S.P. Dance (1986). Compendium of sea shells. American Malacologists, Inc:Melbourne, Florida

External links
 

Muricidae
Gastropods described in 1778